Arthur J. Sohmer (February 16, 1926 – August 25, 1991) was an American attorney and government official who served as Chief of Staff to the Vice President from 1969 to 1973.

Early life and education 
Sohmer was born in Wilkes-Barre, Pennsylvania. He graduated from Lafayette College and the law school at the University of Maryland Francis King Carey School of Law.

Career 
Sohmer served in the United States Navy during World War II.

Sohmer moved to Baltimore, Maryland, in 1956. In 1962, he ran for a seat in the Maryland House of Delegates but lost in the primary. Later that year, he managed Spiro Agnew's successful campaign for Baltimore County executive. Agnew was the first Republican to win that office, a feat not repeated until 1990. Sohmer was appointed by Agnew to the Baltimore County Tax Appeals Court in 1963 and became its chief judge in 1964. Sohmer also managed Agnew's successful campaign for governor of Maryland in 1966. Sohmer then managed appointments in the Maryland governor's office.

After Agnew was elected vice president in 1968 on a ticket with Richard Nixon, Sohmer became his chief of staff. After Agnew's resignation in 1973, Sohmer held positions with the General Services Administration and the United States Railway Association.

In 1978, Sohmer was a founding partner in the Learning Tree, a mail-order company dealing in special education materials.

Personal life 
Sohmer died of lung cancer at his home in Woodstock, New York in 1991 at the age of 65.

References

1926 births
1991 deaths
Chiefs of Staff to the Vice President of the United States
Nixon administration personnel
Politicians from Wilkes-Barre, Pennsylvania
Deaths from lung cancer in New York (state)